Alexander Edelmann (7 June 1904, Hostomel, Russian Empire – 31 October 1995, New York, United States), was a Soviet and American pianist and piano teacher.

In 1923 he completed the Kyiv Conservatory, studying under Heinrich Neuhaus.

From 1925 he taught at the Kyiv Conservatory.

1943-1950 — professor at the Kyiv Conservatory.

1950-1978 — professor at the Lviv Conservatory.

In 1978 he emigrated from the USSR to the USA.  From 1978 he lived in the USA.  He worked as a professor at New York University.

References

1904 births
1995 deaths

Soviet emigrants to the United States
American people of Ukrainian-Jewish descent
Soviet pianists
New York University people
Academic staff of Lviv Conservatory
Academic staff of Kyiv Conservatory
New York University faculty
Ukrainian musicians
Ukrainian classical pianists
Jewish Ukrainian musicians